Shunting may refer to:

 Ribosome shunting, a mechanism in protein biosynthesis
 Shunting (rail), a rail transport operation
 Shunting (neurophysiology), a concept in neurophysiology
 Shunting (sailing), a maneuver for sailing upwind

See also
 Shunt (disambiguation)